is Ali Project's first greatest hits album, released on December 6, 1995.

Track listing

References

1995 albums